Go 6976 (also known as Go-6976 and Goe 6976) is a protein kinase inhibitor. It has some specificity for protein kinase C alpha and beta, and through their inhibition it is thought to induce the formation of cell junctions, and hence inhibit the invasion of urinary bladder carcinoma cells".

References 

Protein kinase inhibitors
Indolocarbazoles
Nitriles